Nancy Everhard (born November 30, 1957) is an American former actress. She became known for her roles in the films DeepStar Six (1989) and The Punisher (1989). She also appeared in television series such as Reasonable Doubts (1991–1993), The Untouchables (1993–1994), and Everwood (2002–2004).

Life and career
Everhard was born in Wadsworth, Ohio. She debuted in a small supporting role in the 1982 TV movie Born Beautiful.

She guest starred on Remington Steele TV series, the February 1985 3rd season, 16th episode, Steele in the Family, as Clarissa. She made a reprise of the same character in the May 1986, 4th season, 22nd episode, Bonds of Steele.

After numerous guest appearances in television series, she appeared in 1989 in the horror movie Demonstone with Jan-Michael Vincent in a larger role. In the sci-fi horror film Deep Star Six (1989), she played a woman in the crew of an underwater station who survived the attack of a monster. In the action film The Punisher (1989), she appeared alongside Dolph Lundgren, Louis Gossett Jr., and Jeroen Krabbé. In 1990, she appeared as the love interest of Tom Skerritt's character in The China Lake Murders, which for many years held the record for the highest rated basic cable film.

In 1991, Everhard played the love interest of Gregory Harrison's lead character on the CBS sitcom The Family Man. Shortly thereafter, she played Kay Lockman in the first season of the NBC legal drama Reasonable Doubts alongside Mark Harmon. She then co-starred as Catherine Ness in the syndicated version of The Untouchables, with  her future husband, Tom Amandes. From 2002 to 2004, Everhard had a regular role on the WB drama Everwood, again working with  Amandes, who played Dr. Hal Abbott on the series.

Personal life
Everhard married actor Tom Amandes in 1996; she met him during the filming of the television series The Untouchables. They have three children together.

Filmography
 1982 Born Beautiful as Model In Red Hot
 1985 Family Ties, season three, episode 20: "Don't Know Much About History..." as Robin Green
 1986 Knight Rider, season four, episode 14: "Out of the Woods" as Samantha Dutton
 1986 Airwolf, season three, episode seven: "Eagles" as Roan Carver
 1989 Demonstone as Sharon Gale
 1989 DeepStar Six as Joyce Collins
 1989 The Trial of the Incredible Hulk as Christa Klein
 1989 The Punisher as Detective Samantha "Sam" Leary
 1989 An Eight Is Enough Wedding as Marlyn "Mike" Fulbright
 1990 Another 48 Hrs. as Female Doctor
 1990 The China Lake Murders as Cindy
 1991-1992 Reasonable Doubts as Kay Lockman
 1993 The Untouchables as Catherine Ness
 1994 Lois & Clark: The New Adventures of Superman as Linda King
 1994 Time Trax as Jobeth Saunders
 1992-1994 Renegade as Attorney Rainwater "R.W." Thackery / Jessica Patterson 
 2002-2004 Everwood as Sharon Hart
 2005 Urban Legends: Bloody Mary as Pam Owens

References

External links
 
 

1957 births
Living people
American film actresses
American television actresses
20th-century American actresses
Actresses from Ohio
People from Wadsworth, Ohio
21st-century American women